A mountain race may refer to:

 Hillclimbing, a type of car race involving climbing hills or mountains
 Fell running, a type of run involving climbing hills or 'fells'
 Mountain running,  a type of run involving climbing hills or mountains